The voiced alveolar, dental and postalveolar plosives (or stops) are types of consonantal sounds used in many spoken languages.

There are only a few languages which distinguishes dental and alveolar stops, Kota, Toda, Venda and some Irish dialects being a few of them.

Features
Features of the voiced alveolar stop:

 There are three specific variants of :
 Dental, which means it is articulated with either the tip or the blade of the tongue at the upper teeth, termed respectively apical and laminal.
 Denti-alveolar, which means it is articulated with the blade of the tongue at the alveolar ridge, and the tip of the tongue behind upper teeth.
 Alveolar, which means it is articulated with either the tip or the blade of the tongue at the alveolar ridge, termed respectively apical and laminal.

Occurrence

Dental or denti-alveolar

Alveolar

Variable

See also
 Index of phonetics articles

Notes

References

External links
 

Alveolar consonants
Plosives
Central consonants
Voiced oral consonants
Pulmonic consonants